Young Bodies Heal Quickly, You Know is an album by The Paper Chase.

Track listing
This May Be the Last Song You Ever Hear
These Things Happen
Ever Since the Turn
Apple Pies and Alibis
Neat; Manageable; Piles
Can I Pour You Another Drink, Lover?
Lenny What's Gotten Into You?
Goddamn These Hands (I Let Them Touch You)
A Face Like That Could Launch a Thousand Ships
Throw Your Body on the Apparatus
Off With Their Heads!
Daddy's Got Your Nose
Paperwork
When You Least Expect It
When (And If) The Big One Hits... I'll Just Meet You There

References

2000 albums
The Paper Chase (band) albums
Kill Rock Stars albums